Vijay Krishna (born 2 September 1951) is a member of the 14th Lok Sabha of India. He represents the Barh constituency of Bihar and is a member of the Rashtriya Janata Dal (RJD) political party.

External links
 Home Page on the Parliament of India's Website

1951 births
Living people
People from Bihar
India MPs 2004–2009
Rashtriya Janata Dal politicians
Lok Sabha members from Bihar